Agrotis vancouverensis, the Vancouver dart, is a moth of the family Noctuidae. The species was first described by Augustus Radcliffe Grote in 1873. It is found in the Pacific Northwest of North America and is common west of the Cascade Mountains.

The length of the forewings is about 33 mm. Adults are on wing in late spring and early summer. There is one generation per year.

The larvae feed on various herbs.

Subspecies
Agrotis vancouverensis vancouverensis
Agrotis vancouverensis semiclarata
Agrotis vancouverensis dentilinea

References

"Macromoths of Northwest Forests and Woodlands". Northern Prairie Wildlife Research Center. U.S. Geological Survey. Archived October 11, 2008.

Agrotis
Moths of North America
Moths described in 1873